Pop Tatari is the third full-length album by Boredoms, released in 1992 by Warner Music Japan, in 1993 by Reprise Records, and in the United Kingdom in 2004 by Very Friendly Records.

All tracks on the album are credited to Boredoms with the exception of "Bo-Go-Bompoo," which is credited to Jet Harris.

Track listing

References

1992 albums
Boredoms albums
Reprise Records albums